Oncobryidae is a family of extinct springtails in the order Collembola. There is at least one genus, †Oncobrya, and one species, †Oncobrya decepta, in Oncobryidae. It has been found in Alberta, Canada

References

Further reading

 
 
 

Entomobryomorpha
Arthropod families